The Mengchong (Chinese: 蒙衝; pinyin: Méngchōng; lit. "covered assaulter") was a leather-covered assault warship used in the 2nd and 3rd centuries CE in China. One of its most famous uses was in the naval battle of Red Cliffs in late 208 to early 209, in which the Eastern Wu commander Zhou Yu ordered Huang Gai to use a group of the ships loaded with flammable material in a fire attack on the navy of Cao Cao. It also saw later use in the navies of the Sui and Tang Dynasties.

References

 Imperial Chinese Navy
 Chen Shou. Records of the Three Kingdoms.

Naval ships of China